Redford Union is a school district in Redford, Michigan, a Township along the west of Detroit. The school district includes Hilbert Middle School, Redford Union High School, Keeler Elementary, Stuckey Elementary, MacGowan Elementary, and formerly Bulman Elementary.  Other buildings in the district are Roosevelt Center, Beck Center and Pearson Education Center, all former K-12 buildings as well as Raeside Administration Building.

A recent vote by the Redford Union Board of Education will change the district configuration.  Bulman and Stuckey elementary schools will house 2nd through 5th grade programs.  MacGowan Elementary will house pre-K, kindergarten and 1st grade programs.  Keeler elementary will house the elementary day treatment program for emotionally impaired students from throughout Wayne County, Michigan.  Pearson Education Center will continue to house the district's Alternative Education Program for middle school and high school students.

Bulman Elementary was torn down in the late 2000s, moving those kids to Keeler and MacGowan.

External links
 Redford Union School District

School districts in Michigan
Education in Wayne County, Michigan